Marko Ilić (born 3 February 1998) is a Serbian football goalkeeper who plays for Colorado Rapids on loan from Kortrijk.

Club career

Vojvodina
Born in Novi Sad, Ilić passed Vojvodina youth school and joined the first team during the 2015–16 Serbian SuperLiga season at the age of 17. He was used as a reserve option sitting on the bench a couple of times until the end of a season, without official appearances. He spent a short part of his career on loan at Serbian League Vojvodina side Cement Beočin. Having spent first half of the 2016–17 season serving as a youth team first choice keeper, and a senior team backup keeper, in the second half of the season Ilić was sent on loan to Proleter Novi Sad. In summer 2017 he returned to the first team, being licensed with Vojvodina for the 2017–18 UEFA Europa League qualifications and the domestic competitions. On 8 December 2017, Ilić signed his first professional contract with the club, penning a three-year-deal. Ilić made his debut for Vojvodina in a 6–1 away win over Čukarički on 17 May 2018.

Voždovac
On 2 August 2018, Marko Ilić signed a three-year-deal with Voždovac.

Kortrijk
On 10 September 2020, Ilić signed a four-year contract with Kortrijk. One month after signing the contract, in December 2020, Ilić was named Player of the Month.

In September and October 2021, Ilić was named Player of the Month by the votes of the fans. 

On 17 February 2023, Ilić was loaned to Major League Soccer club Colorado Rapids for their 2023 season.

International career

Youth
Early in his career, Ilić was a member of the Serbian under-16, under-17 and under-18 national team selections. In September 2016, he made his debut for the Serbian under-19 team, being elected for the best goalkeeper of the memorial tournament "Stevan Vilotić - Ćele". Ilić was also invited in the squad for the 2017 UEFA European Under-19 Championship under coach Milan Obradović, where he appeared as the first choice keeper.

Senior
He made his debut for Serbia national football team on 7 June 2021 in a friendly against Jamaica, and he did not concede a goal in the half he spent on the field. After his debut, during 2021 and 2022, Ilić received several invitations to the national team, but he remained on the bench as a reserve goalkeeper.

Career statistics

Club

International

Notes

References

External links
 
 
 

1998 births
Living people
Footballers from Novi Sad
Association football goalkeepers
Serbian footballers
Serbia youth international footballers
Serbia under-21 international footballers
FK Vojvodina players
FK Cement Beočin players
FK Proleter Novi Sad players
FK Voždovac players
K.V. Kortrijk players
Colorado Rapids players
Serbian First League players
Serbian SuperLiga players
Belgian Pro League players
Serbian expatriate footballers
Expatriate footballers in Belgium
Serbian expatriate sportspeople in Belgium
Serbia international footballers
Expatriate soccer players in the United States
Serbian expatriate sportspeople in the United States